The Hotel deLuxe is a hotel located in southwest Portland, Oregon, in the Goose Hollow neighborhood.

Description and history
Built in 1912 as the Mallory Hotel, the hotel was commissioned by Rufus Mallory, a Portland lawyer and politician, and is listed on the National Register of Historic Places under its original name. It was sold in 2004, renovated, and reopened as the Hotel deLuxe in 2006. The hotel houses the bar, Driftwood Room.

Reception
In 2004, Jemiah Jefferson—who "set a section of one of [her] novels there"—called the hotel "one of the last magical places in [Portland], so precious and evocative of a better-dressed time of sloe-gin fizzes, slingbacks and Benny Goodman, where the bartenders are good-looking, heavy-pouring charmers and mystery seems to lurk in the brilliant reflections of the mirrored walls."

See also
 Lucy A. Mallory
 National Register of Historic Places listings in South and Southwest Portland, Oregon

References

External links

Hotel deLuxe
Hotel deLuxe
Hotel buildings completed in 1912
Hotel buildings on the National Register of Historic Places in Portland, Oregon
Hotels established in 1912
Hotel deLuxe